The Wahpeton–Breckenridge Methodists were a minor league baseball team based in Wahpeton, North Dakota in partnership with Breckenridge, Minnesota. In 1897, the Methodists played as members of the Class F level Red River Valley League in their only season of play, preceding the 1921 Wahpeton-Breckenridge Twins.

History
The Wahpeton–Breckenridge Methodists were charter members of the 1897 Red River Valley League. The league began minor league baseball play as a four–team, Class F level league. The Methodists joined the Fargo Divorcees, Grand Forks Senators and Moorhead Barmaids in beginning league play on May 26, 1897. Player salaries were capped at $40.00 per month by the league.

The Wahpeton–Breckenridge Methodists were owned by a group of local businessmen headed by Claude Rittenhouse, who was an area druggist.

The Red River Valley League permanently disbanded on August 8, 1897, eight days after the first–half of the season had ended.

Methodist player Jimmy Hart had a violent altercation with an umpire during the season, knocking umpire Lyons to the ground and "bruising him badly" following a game against Fargo.

When the Red River Valley League folded on August 8, 1897, the Wahpeton–Breckenridge Methodists were in 3rd place, 12.0 games behind. The Moorhead Barmaids were in 1st place in the league standings with a 32–13 record. Moorhead was 10.5 games ahead of the 2nd place Grand Forks Senators (19–21), followed by the Wahpeton–Breckenridge Methodists (16–21) and Fargo Divorcees (17–29).

The two cities resumed minor league play in 1921, when the Wahpeton-Breckenridge Twins began play as members of the Class D level Dakota League.

The ballpark
The name and location of the home minor league ballpark for the Wahpeton–Breckenridge Methodists is unknown.

On June 10, 1897, the Ringling Brothers Circus was setting up for a performance in Wahpeton when a lightning strike killed three workers.

Year–by–year record

Notable alumni

Jimmy Hart (1897)

References

External links
Baseball Reference

Professional baseball teams in North Dakota
Defunct baseball teams in North Dakota
Baseball teams established in 1897
Baseball teams disestablished in 1897
Defunct baseball teams in Minnesota
Wahpeton, North Dakota
Wilkin County, Minnesota